Georgios Arestis (born 27 December 1981) is a Cypriot athlete who competes in the shot put and discus throw. He represented his country at two Commonwealth Games and won multiple medals at the Games of the Small States of Europe.

Competition record

Personal bests
Outdoor
Shot put – 19.34 (Lefkosia 2009)
Discus throw – 55.65 (Trípoli 2002)
Indoor
Shot put – 19.43 (Peanía 2009) NR

References

1981 births
Living people
Cypriot male shot putters
Cypriot male discus throwers
Commonwealth Games competitors for Cyprus
Athletes (track and field) at the 2002 Commonwealth Games
Athletes (track and field) at the 2010 Commonwealth Games
Athletes (track and field) at the 2009 Mediterranean Games
Mediterranean Games competitors for Cyprus